Yves Vidal (born 27 November 1946) is a French politician.

Vidal was born in Pernes-les-Fontaines on 27 November 1946.

Vidal began his political career as a member of the Socialist Party. Vidal withdrew from the party in 1991, and later joined the Radical Party of the Left. He announced his support for The Republicans in November 2015.

Vidal was first elected mayor of Grans in 1987. He served on the National Assembly from 1988 to 1993, representing Bouches-du-Rhône's 10th constituency.

References

1946 births
Living people
People from Vaucluse
Deputies of the 9th National Assembly of the French Fifth Republic
Socialist Party (France) politicians
Radical Party of the Left politicians
The Republicans (France) politicians
Mayors of places in Provence-Alpes-Côte d'Azur
21st-century French politicians